Asit Sen (13 May 1917 – 18 September 1993) was an Indian film director turned famous comedian in the Hindi film industry. He directed 2 films and starred in over 200 films between 1953 and 1993 until his death. As an actor/comedian, he often portrayed a character with authority, such as a police inspector or landlord, but with comic effect, mostly as a slow-speaking person. His acting career was particularly prolific in the 1960s, 1970s, and early 1980s. He had a very thin voice, in striking contrast to his huge physical frame and spoke his dialogues at a slow pace.

Sen started his career, assisting director-producer Bimal Roy in Kolkata, however, the Kolkata-based film industry was now on the decline, thus Roy shifted base to Bombay (now Mumbai) along with Roy's team in 1950, which included Sen, Hrishikesh Mukherjee, Nabendu Ghosh, Kamal Bose and later Salil Chaudhury. Along with doing small roles in films he directed two films for his mentor's production house, Parivar (1956) and Apradhi Kaun (1957), before choosing acting as his full time career, playing comic roles with almost every known name in the industry.

Filmography

Hindi

Bengali

References

External links
 
 Asit Sen at Bollywood Hungama
 Tracing Asit Sens Directorial Footsteps by Bobby Sing in The Free Press Journal
 Parivar (1956) and Apradhi Kaun (1957) Two films directed by the actor-comedian Asit Sen at Bobbytalkscinema.com

Indian male film actors
Male actors in Hindi cinema
Bengali male actors
20th-century Indian male actors
Indian male comedians
20th-century comedians
1917 births
1993 deaths
University of Calcutta alumni